Carson College for Orphan Girls, also known as Carson Valley School, is a historic school complex and national historic district located in Flourtown, Springfield Township, Montgomery County, Pennsylvania. The buildings remain in active use by the same institution, now   coeducational and named Carson Valley Children's Aid.

Buildings 
The district encompasses nine contributing buildings.  They are an assemblage of low-scale, Tudor Revival style structures built between 1917 and 1932.  It includes the Mother Goose Cottage (1917-1920), Red Gables Cottage (1917-1920), Stork Hill (1918), Thistle Cottage (1917-1920), Upper Beech Cottage (c. 1930), Lower Beech Cottage (c. 1930), Beech Branch Cottage (c. 1930), a garage (1917-1920), and a shop / storehouse (1932).  The campus was designed by architect Albert Kelsey (1870-1950) to be reminiscent of a 16th-century English village.

It was listed on the National Register of Historic Places in 1991.

The school 
Founded in 1917 by Philadelphia philanthropists Robert and Isabel Carson, the school was renamed Carson Valley Children's Aid (CVCA) after a 2008 merger with the Norristown-based Children's Aid Society. CVCA provides regular and special education, behavioral therapy and psychotherapy for 6th–12th grade boys and girls who have behavioral disorders or mental illnesses, in residential as well as day school programs.

References

External links 

Carson Valley Children's Aid

School buildings on the National Register of Historic Places in Pennsylvania
Tudor Revival architecture in Pennsylvania
1917 establishments in Pennsylvania
Schools in Montgomery County, Pennsylvania
Private middle schools in Pennsylvania
Private high schools in Pennsylvania
Historic districts on the National Register of Historic Places in Pennsylvania
National Register of Historic Places in Montgomery County, Pennsylvania